The Ann Arbor was an automobile manufactured in Ann Arbor, Michigan, by the Huron River Manufacturing Company from 1911–12.  The Ann Arbor was a dual-purpose vehicle, which could be converted from a private car, to a small pickup.  Automotive production, however, never succeeded in Ann Arbor. The ill-fated Huron River Manufacturing Company, later the Star Motor Company, did not survive the fierce competition of the burgeoning auto industry. The high cost of living in Ann Arbor meant higher wages and the distance from Detroit increased the cost of materials to a point where profit disappeared.

See also
Brass Era car

References

External links 
 Huron River Manufacturing Company

Defunct motor vehicle manufacturers of the United States
Motor vehicle manufacturers based in Michigan
Defunct manufacturing companies based in Michigan
Culture of Ann Arbor, Michigan